Silene otites, called Spanish catchfly, is a species of flowering plant in the genus Silene, native to Europe and the Transcaucasus area, and introduced to Xinjiang in China. It varies its floral odors to attract mosquitoes and moths at night and flies and bees by day. It is dioecious, with separate male and female plants.

Subspecies
The following subspecies are currently accepted:
Silene otites subsp. hungarica Wrigley
Silene otites subsp. otites

References

otites
Plants described in 1799
Dioecious plants